The Football Conference season of 1990–91 (known as the GM Vauxhall Conference for sponsorship reasons) was the twelfth season of the Football Conference.

Overview
Barnet finished the season as Conference champions and were promoted to the Football League Fourth Division, finishing narrowly ahead of Colchester United, who had been relegated to the Conference a year earlier.

There was no relegation from the Fourth Division to the Conference this year, due to expansion of the Football League.

New teams in the league this season
 Bath City (promoted 1989–90)
 Colchester United (relegated from the Football League 1989–90)
 Gateshead (promoted 1989–90)
 Slough Town (promoted 1989–90)

Final league table

Results

Top scorers in order of league goals

Promotion and relegation

Promoted
 Barnet (to the Football League Fourth Division)
 Farnborough Town (from the Southern Premier League)
 Redbridge Forest (from the Isthmian League)
 Witton Albion (from the Northern Premier League)

Relegated
 Fisher Athletic (to the Southern Premier League)
 Sutton United (to the Isthmian League)

References

External links
 1990–91 Conference National Results

National League (English football) seasons
5